Orectoderus obliquus is a species of plant bug in the family Miridae. It is found in North America.

Subspecies
These two subspecies belong to the species Orectoderus obliquus:
 Orectoderus obliquus ferrugineus Knight, 1923
 Orectoderus obliquus obliquus Uhler, 1876

References

Further reading

 

Phylinae
Articles created by Qbugbot
Insects described in 1876